Miconia gonioclada is a species of plant in the family Melastomataceae. It is endemic to Ecuador.  Its natural habitats are subtropical or tropical moist montane forests and subtropical or tropical dry shrubland.

References

Endemic flora of Ecuador
gonioclada
Vulnerable plants
Taxonomy articles created by Polbot